The season began on 21 August 2010 and ended on 11 June 2011.

Clubs East

League standing

Clubs West

League standing

See also
2010–11 Slovenian Second League

External links
Football Association of Slovenia 
MNZ Ptuj 
MNZ Koper 

Slovenian Third League seasons
3
Slovenia